Didymarchus is mentioned by Antoninus Liberalis (23) as the author of a work on Metamorphoses, of which the third book is there quoted.
Didymarchos son of Apollonios was a Macedonian of the fifth hipparchy in Kerkeosiris, a village in Ptolemaic Egypt.

References

Kerkeosiris By Dorothy J. Crawford Page 33  

Ancient Greek writers known only from secondary sources
Ancient Macedonians
Ancient Greek mythographers